Elizabeth Stakes may refer to:

 Princess Elizabeth Stakes, horse race in UK
 Princess Elizabeth Stakes (Canada), horse race in Canada
 Queen Elizabeth Stakes (VRC), horse race in Melbourne, Victoria, Australia
 Queen Elizabeth Stakes (ATC), horse race in Sydney, New South Wales, Australia
 King George VI and Queen Elizabeth Stakes, horse race in UK
 Queen Elizabeth II Stakes, horse race in UK
 Queen Elizabeth II Challenge Cup Stakes, horse race in USA

See also
 Elizabeth (disambiguation)
 Elizabeth Cup (disambiguation)
 Queen's Cup (disambiguation)